Newellton Airport  is a public use airport in Tensas Parish, Louisiana, United States. It is owned by the Town of Newellton and located one mile (2 km) southwest of its central business district.

Facilities and aircraft 
Newellton Airport covers an area of 20 acres (8 ha) at an elevation of 77 feet (23 m) above mean sea level. It has one runway designated 6/24 with an asphalt surface measuring 2,750 by 75 feet (838 x 23 m).

For the 12-month period ending August 15, 2000, the airport had 7,000 general aviation aircraft operations, an average of 19 per day. At that time, there were eight single-engines based at this airport.

See also 
 List of airports in Louisiana

References

External links 
 Aerial image as of November 1989 from USGS The National Map
 Aeronautical chart at SkyVector

Airports in Louisiana
Transportation in Tensas Parish, Louisiana
Buildings and structures in Tensas Parish, Louisiana